Public law is the area of law concerned with relationship between the state and the citizen.

Public Law may also refer to:

Public Law (journal), an academic law journal
Public Law (United States), an Act of Congress affecting the general public
Public bill, a United States government bill which proposes a public law
The Public Law Project, an independent, national legal charity in Great Britain
Public international law, law that concerns the structure and conduct of sovereign states

See also 
 for articles on specific Public Laws
Private Law (disambiguation)
Acts of Parliament in the United Kingdom, public laws passed by the Parliament of the United Kingdom or by the Scottish Parliament